The 2014 EuroV8 Series was the first and final season of the EuroV8 Series, a series formed using the machinery from the Superstars Series, which folded after the 2013 season. The series was re-branded by the FG Group and the Associazione Team Top Car (ATT) for the 2014 season.

Three drivers went into the final round at Hockenheim with a chance of winning the drivers' championship title. Audi Sport Italia/SMR driver Tomáš Kostka went into the event with a two-point championship lead over Nicola Baldan of the Roma Racing Team, while Solaris Motorsport's Francesco Sini was also in contention, thirteen points in arrears of Kostka's lead. Kostka extended his lead by adding the pole position point to his tally, but after an eventful race, it was Sini who prevailed. Sini won the race with an extra point for fastest lap, while Kostka finished down in fourth place after contact with Sini's team-mate Giovanni Berton and Diego Romanini – breaking a halfshaft and causing a puncture respectively – which gave Sini the title by one point. Baldan had already been eliminated from contention after being involved in a first lap incident with Team BMW Dinamic team-mates Max Mugelli and Niccolò Mercatali.

Sini and Kostka shared the most wins during the season with three each, while Baldan only won once, at Mugello. Mercatali also won at Mugello, with the only other driver to win a race during the season being Eddie Cheever III, who won both races at the season opening round at Monza. Despite only competing at that event, Cheever was the winner of the Under-25 trophy by a single point from Jonathan Giacon. The teams' championship went to Audi Sport Italia/SMR, as Kostka was supported by four podium finishes for team-mates Davide Stancheris, Ermanno Dionisio and Emanuele Zonzini; they won the title by ten points ahead of Solaris Motorsport. Dionisio accrued the most points in the trophy for gentleman drivers, finishing 11 points clear of Leonardo Baccarelli, while the Speedy Trophy for most fastest laps went to Kostka, with 4.

Teams and drivers

Race calendar and results
The championship will be contested over ten races to be held at six circuits in Italy, the Czech Republic and Germany.

Championship standings

Drivers' Championship

Scoring system

† – Drivers did not finish the race, but were classified as they completed over 50% of the race distance.

Teams' championship

References

External links
  

2014 in motorsport
2014 in Italian motorsport
2014 in European sport